Egypt sent a delegation to compete at the 2000 Summer Paralympics in Sydney, Australia. Egyptian athletes won six gold medals, twelve silver and ten bronze, enabling their country to finish 23rd out of 123 on the medal table. Athletics and powerlifting were equally successful, with each sport giving 3 gold medals each to Egypt.

Background 
The Egyptian team included 45 sportspeople, 12 women and 33 men. This was 7 more women than the country had sent to Atlanta for the 1996 Games. General Union of Sports Clubs for the Disabled had served as Egypt's NPC since 1982. In 1998, two years before the Sydney Games, it was replaced by the Egyptian Disabled Sports Federation as a result of President of the Council of Ministers Order No. (659).

Medals 
Egypt finished the Sydney hosted Games with 28 totals medals, 6 gold, 12 silver and 10 bronze, enabling their country to finish 23rd out of 123 on the medal table.

Athletics

Egypt won three gold medals, six silver and seven bronze in athletics. Egyptian athletes competed at the 1999 Disabled Sports USA DS/USA's National Summer Games as part of their preparation efforts for the 2000 Games. Mahmoud Elatar set a world record of 49.92m in men's javelin F58 while Ibrahim Allam set a personal record of 14.77m in shot put, both athletes gained gold medals.

Powerlifting
Egypt won three gold medals, five silver and four bronze, dropping from first place in Atlanta to third in Sydney, behind China and Nigeria.

Metwalli Mathana made his second Paralympic appearance at these Games. Fatma Omar made her Paralympic debut in Sydney, winning her first gold medal in powerlifting at the Games in the -44 kg class. Ahmed Gomaa Mohamed Ahmed participated in his third Games in Sydney. Mohamed Ahmed took up the sport in 1984, and decided to compete internationally because he was able to lift more than his able-bodied counterparts in Egypt. In the period around these Games, he was training five days a week, three hours a day. He was getting funding from the Egyptian Paralympic Committee to allow him to train full-time. In Sydney, he repeated his performance from Atlanta, winning gold and setting a world record in the men's -56 kg class. Osama Elserngawy won silver in the Men's 52 kg event.

See also
Egypt at the Paralympics
Egypt at the 2000 Summer Olympics

External links
International Paralympic Committee

References 

Nations at the 2000 Summer Paralympics
2000
2000 in Egyptian sport